Paul Jasmin (born April 1935) is an American artist based in Los Angeles, California. Jasmin was an illustrator, a painter, and an actor before finding photography. His commercial work has appeared in Vogue, Teen Vogue, GQ, Details, V Magazine, V Man, Vogue Hommes, W Magazine, and Interview. Jasmin has illustrated and photographed fashion campaigns for luxury brands, including Valentino, A.P.C, and he sits on the faculty of Art Center College of Design in Pasadena, California.

Early career
In 1954 Jasmin left his hometown of Helena, Montana to travel and pursue acting in Paris, Egypt, New York, Morocco and Los Angeles. He appears as an actor in Riot in Juvenile Prison (1959), Midnight Cowboy (1969) and, later, Adaptation (2002). Together with actresses Virginia Gregg and Jeanette Nolan, Paul Jasmin provided the voice for Norman's mother in Alfred Hitchcock's classic Psycho (1960). The three voices were thoroughly mixed except for the last speech, which is all Gregg's.

After Jasmin's brief career as an actor the artist pursued painting and illustration. From 1965–1975, Jasmin illustrated fashion campaigns for the luxury brand, Valentino. He also illustrated the poster for the 1972 film Bijou, directed by Wakefield Poole.

Photography
At the urging of friend and photographer Bruce Weber, Jasmin began photographing for commercial clients in the late 1970s. Jasmin has realized campaigns for brands including, A.P.C., SAKS, Nautica and Mr. Porter. Jasmin is represented by WM Artist Management http://www.wmartistmanagement.com/artists/photographers/paul-jasmin/

Jasmin currently teaches photography at the Art Center College of Design in Pasadena, California.

Monographs
 Hollywood Cowboy (Arena Editions, 2002)
 Lost Angeles (Steidl, 2008)
 California Dreaming (Steidl, 2011)

References

Living people
1935 births
American artists
American male actors
People from Helena, Montana
American expatriates in France
American expatriates in Egypt
American expatriates in Morocco